The 2005 Norwegian Football Cup was the 100th edition of the Norwegian Football Cup. The tournament started on 7 May 2005 and was contested by 128 teams, going through 7 rounds before a winner could be declared. The final match was played on 6 November at Ullevaal stadion in Oslo. Molde won their 2nd Norwegian Championship title after defeating Lillestrøm in the final with the score 4–2 after extra time.

The clubs from Tippeligaen all made it to the third round (round of 32) without problems. Two surprises came in the third round, as F.C. Lyn Oslo and Tromsø IL lost to Hønefoss BK and Alta I.F. respectively. Alta's inclusion into the fourth round (round of 16) marked the longest a club from Finnmark had ever come in the Norwegian men's football cup. Alta lost to Odd Grenland in the fourth round, while Hønefoss continued to surprise, eventually making it to the semi-finals before being knocked out by Molde.

Molde FK won the cup by defeating Lillestrøm SK 4–2 in the final match after extra time.

Calendar
Below are the dates for each round as given by the official schedule:

First round 

|colspan="3" style="background-color:#97DEFF"|7 May 2005

|-
|colspan="3" style="background-color:#97DEFF"|10 May 2005

|-
|colspan="3" style="background-color:#97DEFF"|11 May 2005

|}

Second round 

|colspan="3" style="background-color:#97DEFF"|18 May 2005

|-
|colspan="3" style="background-color:#97DEFF"|19 May 2005

|}

Third round 

|colspan="3" style="background-color:#97DEFF"|15 June 2005

|-
|colspan="3" style="background-color:#97DEFF"|16 June 2005

|-
|colspan="3" style="background-color:#97DEFF"|22 June 2005

|}

Fourth round 

|colspan="3" style="background-color:#97DEFF"|29 June 2005

|-
|colspan="3" style="background-color:#97DEFF"|30 June 2005

|}

Bracket

Quarter-finals

Semi-finals

Final

References

 
Norwegian Football Cup seasons
Cup
Norway